David M. Scienceman is an Australian scientist; he changed his name from David Slade by deed poll in 1972. McGhee (1990) wrote that his change of name from Slade to Scienceman was an experiment to create a movement of scientifically aware politicians. In a world dominated by scientific achievements and problems, Slade believed that there should be a political party that represented the scientific point of view (Cadzow 1984).

Scienceman has a mathematics and physics degree and a PhD in chemical engineering from Sydney University (Australia), on a scholarship from the Australian Atomic Energy Commission (Cadzow 1984).

At a meeting of the World Future Society in 1976, a group of American feminists told him his new name was unbearably sexist. He saw their point and decided that a better title for members of the Scientific Party would be "Sciencemate" (Cadzow 1984).

For Cadzow, Scienceman:

Author of emergy nomenclature
Scienceman claimed to be the author of the nomenclature of "emergy". In a letter to the Ecological Engineering journal (1997, p. 209) he wrote:

H.T. Odum (1997, p. 215) wrote:

References
 J. Cadzow (1984) Dr Scienceman's brave new word, The Australian, Newspaper Article, Tuesday, 15 May, p. 7.
 H.T. Odum (1997) Letter to the Editor: Emergy terminology. Ecol. Engr. 9: 215–216. ISSN 0925-8574, .
 J. McGhee (1990), Super Scienceman, Extract from the Edinburgh EVENING NEWS, Scotland, 6 April, p. 1.
 D.M. Scienceman (1987) Energy and Emergy. In G. Pillet and T. Murota (eds), Environmental Economics: The Analysis of a Major Interface. Geneva: R. Leimgruber. pp. 257–276. (CFW-86-26)
 D.M. Scienceman (1989) The Emergence of Emonomics. In Proceedings of the International Society for General Systems Research Conference (2–7 July 1989), Edinburgh, Scotland, 7 pp. (CFW-89-02).
 D.M. Scienceman (1991) Emergy and Energy: The Form and Content of Ergon. Discussion paper. Gainesville: Center for Wetlands, University of Florida. 13 pp. (CFW-91-10)
 D.M. Scienceman (1995), The Emergy Synthesis of Religion and Science, Center for Environmental Policy, University of Florida. 13pp.
 D.M. Scienceman (1997) Letters to the Editor: Emergy definition, Ecological Engineering, 9, pp. 209–212. ISSN 0925-8574, .
 D.M. Scienceman (1992), Emvalue and Lavalue, Center for Environmental Policy, University of Florida.
  D.M. Scienceman and B.M. El-Youssef (1993) The System of Emergy Units, in Packham, R. ed. Ethical management of science as a system, International Society for the Systems Sciences, Proceedings of the thirty-seventh annual meeting, University of Western Sydney, Hawkesbury, 5–9 July, pp. 214–223.
 D.M. Scienceman and F. Ledoux (2000) Sublimation, in M.T.Brown (ed.) Emergy Synthesis:Theory and Applications of the Emergy Methodology, Proceedings of the 1st Biennial Emergy Analysis Research Conference, Center for Environmental Policy, University of Florida, pp. 317–321.

Australian scientists
Systems ecologists
Year of birth missing (living people)
Living people